Ralph Freeman may refer to:

 Ralph Freeman (MP for Northampton) (by 1509-58/59), English MP for Northampton (UK Parliament constituency)
 Ralph Freeman (MP for Winchelsea) (1589–1667), English MP for Winchelsea (UK Parliament constituency)
 Ralph Freeman (lawyer) (fl. 1610–1655), English civil lawyer, dramatist and translator
 Ralph Freeman (Lord Mayor) (died 1634), English merchant who was Lord Mayor of London in 1633
 Ralph Freeman (1880–1950), undertook design work for the Sydney Harbour Bridge and founder of Freeman, Fox & Partners
 Ralph Freeman (1911–1998), son of the above, designer of the Humber Suspension Bridge
 Ralph M. Freeman (1902–1990), American judge

See also
Ralph Freman (disambiguation)
Ralph Friedman (pronounced Freedman, 1916–1995), U.S. author
Ralph Friedman (NYPD Detective)